Wilfred Frank Curtis (24 February 1923 – 25 May 2005) was an Anglican priest.

He was born on 24 February 1923 and educated at Foster's School in Sherborne and Bishop Wordsworth's School in Salisbury. After service with the Royal Artillery in the Second World War, he completed his studies at King's College London. He was ordained in 1952 and became curate of High Wycombe. He was with the Church Missionary Society from 1955 to 1974 when he became provost of Sheffield.

He retired in 1988 and died on 25 May 2005.

References

	

1923 births
People educated at Foster's School
People educated at Bishop Wordsworth's School
Alumni of the Theological Department of King's College London
Associates of King's College London
20th-century English Anglican priests
Royal Artillery officers
Provosts and Deans of Sheffield
2005 deaths
British Army personnel of World War II